The qualification for the UEFA Women's Euro 1993 was held between September 21, 1991 & November 14, 1992. The winner of the quarter-finals qualified.

First round

Group 1

Group 2

Group 3

Group 4

Group 5

Group 6

Due to political instability and war unrest in Yugoslavia, the first leg was played in Bulgaria and the second leg was not played.

Group 7

Group 8

Second round

First leg

Second leg

Italy won 6–2 on aggregate.

Denmark won 3–2 on aggregate.

Norway won 6–0 on aggregate.

Germany won 7–0 on aggregate.

Italy, Denmark, Norway and Germany qualified for the final tournament.

References

External links
1991–93 UEFA Women's EURO at UEFA.com
Tables & results at RSSSF.com

UEFA Women's Championship qualification
UEFA
UEFA